Alumni members as well as professors and teachers of Hindu School, Kolkata are nicknamed Hindu School People. The school's alumni includes many educationalists, poets, writers, social reformers, political activists, doctors and engineers. 
 Satyendranath Tagore.
 Jyotirindranath Tagore.
 Taraknath Palit
 Womesh Chunder Bonnerjee
 Satyendra Nath Bose
 Chhabi Biswas
 Nitin Bose
 Birendranath Sircar
 Meghnad Saha
 Michael Modhusudan Dutt
 Young Bengals
 Prasanna Kumar Tagore
 Rajendralal Mitra
 Peary Chand Mitra 
 Dr. Pratap Chandra Chunder 
 Keshob Chandra Sen
 Nisith Ranjan Ray
 Rishi Rajnarayan Bosu
 Anandamohan Bose
 Kaliprasanna Singha
 Kulada Charan Das Gupta

 Social reform
 Rajendralal Mitra - first Indian administrator of Asiatic Society.
 Surendranath Banerjee - educationalist, social reformer and political activist during Indian freedom movement.
 Young Bengals - Derozians, key people of Young Bengal Movement.
 Keshob Chandra Sen - key person of The Bramha Samaj Movement.
 Anandamohan Bose - prominent leader of Bramha Samaj Movement.

 Professors
 Taraknath Palit -An eminent professor and founder member or Calcutta University Science College.
 Satyendranath Bose -an eminent professor, known world-wide for the famous Bose–Einstein statistics theory. 
 Meghnad Saha -Professor and famous scientist.
 Prasanta Chandra Mahalanobis -Famous educationist, scientist, founder of Indian Statistical Institute.

 Education
 Manindra Chandra Nandy -An eminent educationalist, founder of Maharaja Manindra Chandra College.
 Dr.Pratap Chandra Chunder -An eminent educationist.
 Surendranath Banerjee -An eminent educationalist, social reformer and political activist during Indian freedom movement.
 Taraknath Palit -An eminent professor and founder member or Calcutta University Science College.
 Prasanta Chandra Mahalanobis -Famous educationist, scientist, founder of Indian Statistical Institute.
 Anandamohan Bose -Founder of City College, Kolkata.
 Kaliprasanna Singha - founder of Vidyotsahini Sabha.

 Political Activism
 Charu Majumdar - key person of extreme leftist movement of Kolkata of 1970's
 Somendra Nath Mitra - prominent leader of Indian National Congress
 Atulya Ghosh - Former Chief-minister of West Bengal
 Womesh Chunder Bonnerjee - one of the founders of Indian National Congress
 Bipin Chandra Pal - leader of August Movement & Indian National Congress
 Anandamohan Bose - founder of Indian National Association.
 Santosh Kumar Mitra - martyr and Indian freedom fighter 
 Radharaman Mitra - Bengali revolutionary in Meerut Conspiracy Case and social historian
 Sankar Das Banerji - Indian barrister and politician

 Poetry & writing
 Peary Chand Mitra - key person of Standard Bengali Language literature
 Premendra Mitra - creator of Ghona Da (a fictional character)
 Hemendra Kumar Roy - writer of juvenile literature
 Michael Modhusudan Dutt - creator of Bengali sonnet, writer of Meghnadbadh Kavya
 Pulak Bandyopadhyay - lyricist of modern Bengali songs
 Kaliprasanna Singha - author of Hutom Pyanchar Naksha, earliest book of Modern Standard Bengali language
 Tridib Kumar Chattopadhyay - author and editor of Kishore Bharati

 Science
 Satyendranath Bose -an eminent professor, known world-wide for the famous Bose–Einstein statistics theory
 Prasanta Chandra Mahalanobis - educationist, scientist, founder of Indian Statistical Institute
 Taraknath Palit - professor and founder member of Calcutta University Science College
 Meghnad Saha - professor and scientist

 Doctors
 Dr.Nilratan Sircar - founder of Campbell Hospital (now, Nilratan Sircar Medical College and Hospital, Kolkata)
 Dr.Radha Gobinda Kar - founder of R.G. Kar Medical College and Hospital, Kolkata

 Performing arts
 Chhabi Biswas - actor, awarded with Padwashre
 Birendranath Sircar - eminent Engineer, Film Producer, founder of New Theaters Calcutta, awarded with Dadasaheb Phalke Award.
 Nitin Bose - director, cinematographer & screenplay writer, awarded with Dadasaheb Phalke Award.
 Pulak Bandyopadhyay - lyricist of modern Bengali songs.
 Shiboprosad Mukherjee - film director
 Sports
 Prasanta Banerjee - football player
 Chuni Goswami - player of Indian football team & Mohun Bagan Athletic Club. 

 Government administration
 Sir Edward Hyde East - Chief-justice of Supreme Court India
 Atulya Ghosh - Former Chief-minister of West Bengal
 Ranjit Gupta - Former commissioner of Calcutta Police
 Kulada Charan Das Gupta- Former Chief Justice of Calcutta High Court.
 
 Industrialists and entrepreneurs
 Purnendu Chatterjee - Key people of Chatterjee Internationals
 Hemendra Mohan Bose - A scientist, entrepreneur of Bengal Renaissance period.

References

Hindu School, Kolkata alumni